Eisenstein on Disney is a 1986 book  edited by film critic Jay Leyda that collects and reprints the various literature that Sergei Eisenstein produced about Walt Disney.

Summary
Eisenstein composed the majority of the text in 1941 after his introduction to the Hollywood culture industry. It was published much later than most of Leyda's other seminal works on Eisenstein and it presents a unique side of this highly theoretical Soviet film director who is usually portrayed as an outsider to American pop culture.

References

External links
Academic essay at Moviefail.com
Another Eisenstein/Disney-related essay by Jonathan Rosenbaum at Criterion Collection
Sergei Eisenstein: Disney Fan|Brows Held High

1986 books
Books about Disney
Books about film
Essays about film